Canatha is a genus of moths of the family Noctuidae.

Species
Canatha confutalis Walker, 1866
Canatha subangulalis Walker, 1866

References
Natural History Museum Lepidoptera genus database

Calpinae